Josif Tatić (13 April 1946 – 8 February 2013) was a Serbian film actor. He appeared in more than one hundred films from 1967 to 2011.

Selected filmography

References

External links
 	
	
	

1946 births
2013 deaths
Actors from Novi Sad
Serbian male film actors
Serbian male television actors
20th-century Serbian male actors
21st-century Serbian male actors